Collagen alpha-1(XXV) chain is a protein that in humans is encoded by the COL25A1 gene.

COL25A1 is a brain-specific membrane-bound collagen. Proteolytic processing releases CLAC, a soluble form of COL25A1 containing the extracellular collagen domains that associates with senile plaques in Alzheimer disease (AD; MIM 104300) brains (Osada et al., 2005).[supplied by OMIM]

Interactions
Collagen, type XXV, alpha 1 has been shown to interact with Amyloid precursor protein.

References

Further reading